Sonny Boy (Italian: Il dono del silenzio) is a 1989 American black comedy-drama thriller film directed by Robert Martin Carroll. The musical score was composed by Carlo Maria Cordio. It stars Paul L. Smith, David Carradine, Brad Dourif, Conrad Janis, Sydney Lassick, Alexandra Powers, and Steve Carlisle. David Carradine wrote the film's theme song, "Paint", which he performs in the film.

Plot summary 
In 1970, Harmony, a small town in New Mexico, is run by a small-time crime boss named Slue, who accepts the delivery of a Lincoln Continental car stolen by his henchmen Weasel, who brings it after killing a couple who was travelling with their child. When the crime boss finds the couple's baby in the backseat he wants to kill him, but he is stopped by his transvestite “wife”, Pearl. Slue decides to keep the baby - which Pearl names “Sonny Boy” - but he cuts out the boy’s tongue and raises him as a mute accomplice in their crimes, training and treating him like a wild dog, and sending Sonny Boy to kill anyone who wants to steal from or opposes Slue's grip over the town. When the grown Sonny Boy escapes and tries to make contact with the outside world, the attention he draws to his warped family results in darkly-humored mayhem.

Cast
 David Carradine ... Pearl
 Paul L. Smith ... Slue
 Brad Dourif ... Weasel
 Conrad Janis ... Doc Bender
 Sydney Lassick ... Charlie P.
 Savina Gersak ... Sandy
 Alexandra Powers ... Rose
 Michael Boston ... Sonny Boy (as Michael Griffin)
 Steve Carlisle ... Sheriff
 Steve Ingrassia ... Deputy
 Stephen Lee Davis ... Bart
 Robert Broyles ... Mayor
 Jeff Bergquist ... Father Owen
 Dalene Young ... Doc Wallace
 Christopher Bradley ... Husband

Legacy 

Carradine wrote and performed the theme songs for several movies that he either directed or starred in, like You and Me, Americana and Sonny Boy. The first verse from the Sonny Boy theme, "Paint" (which he wrote while filming Americana in Drury, Kansas, in 1973), is engraved on his headstone, as an epitaph.

Home Media 
This movie was released in Blu-ray format in January 2016, with English audio and subtitles, by Shout! Factory. Special features include audio commentaries with director Robert Martin Carroll, and with screenwriter Graeme Whifler.

References

External links
 

1989 films
1989 action films
1989 drama films
1989 thriller films
American thriller films
Italian thriller films
Films shot in New Mexico
1980s English-language films
1980s American films
1980s Italian films